Sir William Phippard (c. 1649 – 23 January 1723) was an English Whig politician. He served as Mayor of Poole in Dorset, and also served as the towns Member of Parliament.

Life 
He was elected Mayor of Poole in 1697.

He was elected to Parliament, in the constituency of Poole in 1698, listed as a member of the Country Party and served in the 4th Parliament of King William III.

He was knighted on 8 February 1699.

He was re-elected in 1702.

He lost his seat at the 1708 general election.

He returned to parliament at the 1710 general election, and stood down at the 1713 general election.

References 

1649 births
1723 deaths
Members of the Parliament of Great Britain for English constituencies
People from Poole
English MPs 1698–1700
English MPs 1705–1707
British MPs 1710–1713
Mayors of Poole
Whig (British political party) MPs for English constituencies
Politicians awarded knighthoods